The archery events at the 2020 Summer Olympics in Tokyo took place in Yumenoshima Park. Five events were planned with a mixed team event staged for the first time.

Qualification

There were 128 qualifying places available for archery at the 2020 Summer Olympics: 64 for men and 64 for women. The qualification standards were released by World Archery in March 2018.

Each National Olympic Committee (NOC) is permitted to enter a maximum of six competitors, three per gender. NOCs that qualify teams for a particular gender are able to send a three-member team to the team event and also have each member compete in the individual event. There are 12 team spots for each gender, thus qualifying 36 individuals through team qualification. All other NOCs may earn a maximum of one quota place per gender for the individual events.

Six places are reserved for Japan as the host nation, and a further four are to be decided by the Tripartite Commission. The remaining 118 places are then allocated through a qualification process, in which archers earn quota places for their respective NOCs, though not necessarily for themselves.

There is no qualification process prior to the 2020 Games for the mixed team event. Instead, qualification for that event is done through the ranking rounds at the beginning of the Games. Each NOC that has qualified at least one man and one woman will have the scores of that NOC's top-scoring man and top-scoring woman in the ranking round summed; the top 16 NOCs are to qualify for mixed team competition.

Competition format 
A total of 128 athletes are expected across the five events: the men's individual, women's individual, men's team, women's team and mixed team. The mixed team event is a new event added for 2020.

All five events are scheduled to be recurve archery events, held under the World Archery-approved 70-meter distance and rules. The competition is expected to start with an initial ranking round involving all 64 archers of each gender. Each archer is to shoot a total of 72 arrows to be seeded from 1–64 according to their score.

The ranking round is also to be used to seed the men's and women's teams from 1 to 12, by aggregating the individual scores for the members of each team. In addition, the ranking round is scheduled to determine the 16 pairs that qualify for the mixed team event (for nations that have both men and women competing, the top men's score and the top women's score are combined) as well as seeding those 16 teams.

Each event was played in a single-elimination tournament format, except for the semi-final losers, who played off to decide the bronze medal winner.

Individual events 
In the individual events, all 64 competitors entered the competition at the first round, the round of 64. The draw was seeded according to the result of the ranking round so the first seed shot against the 64th seed in the first round.

Each match is to be scored using the Archery Olympic Round, consisting of the best-of-five sets, with three arrows per set. The winner of each set receives two points, and if the scores in the set are tied then each archer receives one point. If at the end of five sets the score is tied at 5–5, a single arrow shoot-off is held and the closest to the center is declared the winner.

Men's and women's team events 
In the team events, the top four seeded teams from the ranking round are to receive a bye to the quarter-final. The remaining eight teams, seeded 5th to 12th, compete for the remaining four places in the quarter-finals.

The team event follows the same Archery Olympic Round set system as the individual event, though each set consists of six arrows (two per team member) and only four sets are held.

Mixed team event 
In the mixed team event, the top 16 seeded teams from the ranking round competed in a single-elimination bracket. 

As with the men's and women's team events, the set system uses two arrows per team member (which means four arrows per team in mixed team) and four sets.

Schedule 
All times are Japan Standard Time (UTC+9).

Participating nations 
128 archers from 51 nations qualified. Qualification tournaments include the 2019 World Archery Championships, various continental events, and a final qualification tournament.

 Host

Competitors

Records

Medal summary

Medal table

Medalists

See also
Archery at the 2018 Asian Games
Archery at the 2018 Summer Youth Olympics
Archery at the 2019 European Games
Archery at the 2019 Pan American Games
Archery at the 2020 Summer Paralympics

References

External links
 Results book 

 
Archery at the Summer Olympics
2020 Summer Olympics events
Olympics
Archery competitions in Japan